In molecular biology, the arfaptin domain is a protein domain which interacts with ARF1, a small GTPase involved in vesicle budding at the Golgi complex and immature secretory granules. The structure of arfaptin shows that upon binding to a small GTPase, arfaptin forms an elongated, crescent-shaped dimer of three-helix coiled-coils. The N-terminal region of ICA69 is similar to arfaptin.

References

Protein domains